"The Punishment of Luxury" is a short story written by Michael Carson. It was published within the book Serving Suggestions: Stories (a collection of 26 short stories) in 1993.

This utopian, or rather dystopian story deals with the consequences of the inauguration of a "Dark Green" government which has introduced "the Punishment of Luxury" according to their radical beliefs about how the world should look like.

Plot summary
In the story a man is executed for driving a car in a futuristic London where environmental correctness has run rampant. The citizens suffer under the Dark Green totalitarian regime where the party prohibits alcohol, cars, tobacco and all other luxury goods that contribute to the pollution of the planet. People who do not follow the rules of the government are executed or brought to the Dark Green Re-education Centre in Mid-Wales where they perform various duties such as dusting off leaves day after day, cleaning out badger setts and nursing cattle.

The main character of the story, Arnold Watney, intrigues against the Dark Green government and puts up secret resistance against it by owning a car (which is called Mabel the Morris Minor and hidden under a sheet in his lounge at home), smoking cigarettes and drinking his home-brew beer.

While watching the execution of a car driver (Dr Stone), Watney realises how dangerous his violations of the Dark Green laws are. Therefore, he secretly dumps his beloved Morris Minor into a pond and confesses his drinking and smoking habits to the Dark Green Cell, who sends him to the Re-education Centre.

After three weeks of re-educational treatment, the Dark Greens are overthrown. Besides Watney, many other people have hidden their cars. However, it turns out that the news of the overthrow has only been a clever strategy of the Dark Green government to rouse cars from their hiding places. The owners of the cars have to bear the consequences of their disobedience and "up and down the country" people are killed by the government.

Analysis
The attitude which is presented by the short story is clearly anti-utopian: although there might have been a formerly honest and upright intention, namely to create a better world by avoiding everything which is unnatural and thus harmful to the environment, it is shown that everything which is driven into an extreme is negative. Another issue actualised in the short story is the appearance of the hidden side of the human nature when the controlling power vanishes.

The opinion expressed in the story is that any political or social group which forces other people to suppress their own human needs, even if they are considered luxuries, destroys an important part of humankind. And since human beings are a part of this nature, which shall be preserved in the story, a restriction of human behaviour can also be interpreted as a violation of nature. A reduction to a more thoughtful and ecological behaviour towards this world would be an agreeable aim, but in a moderate and respectful way, which grants nature and human beings the possibility to bloom.

The origin of the title is probably the 1891 painting by Giovanni Segantini in the Walker Art Gallery, Liverpool.

See also

Future Primitive: The New Ecotopias

Dystopian literature
Environmental fiction books
British short stories
1993 short stories